Highway 109 is a  highway in western Arkansas.  It runs from the Ouachita Mountains to the Arkansas River Valley in Logan and Johnson counties. There are no spur routes associated with this highway.

Mount Magazine can be seen to the east on the southern portion of the route.  It can also be seen south of the Highway 22 portion of the Route.

One of the most famous feature on the route is the Morrison Bluff Bridge, also known as the Ada Mills Bridge, over the Arkansas River. This  bridge claims to be the longest over the Arkansas River and also the longest bridge in Arkansas. However, it is shorter than two current Mississippi River bridges partially located in Arkansas, the Hernando de Soto Bridge and the Greenville Bridge.

Route description

Highway 109 begins at Highway 217 in Logan County. It joins highway 309 north for a mile, then departs Highway 309 join Highway 22 east. It follows Highway 22 east for the next  where it departs that highway to head north. It then travels north via the Ada Mills Bridge across the Arkansas River to U.S. Highway 64 in Clarksville.

Major intersections

See also

 List of state highways in Arkansas

References

See also

109
Transportation in Logan County, Arkansas
Transportation in Johnson County, Arkansas